Moussa Sylla (born 25 November 1999) is a French professional footballer who plays as a forward or winger for  club Caen.

Career
On 10 February 2017, Sylla signed his first professional contract with FC Monaco keeping him at the club until June 2020. He made his professional debut for Monaco in a 3–1 Ligue 1 loss to Guingamp on 21 April 2018.

He scored his first professional goals on his first start on 6 May 2018, finding the back of the net both times in a 2–1 away victory against Caen in Ligue 1.

He was released from Monaco upon the expiration of his contract at the end of the 2019–20 Ligue 1 season.

On 15 September 2020, Sylla signed a three-year contract with Eredivisie side FC Utrecht, with an option to extend the contract until 2024. On 25 September 2021, he scores his second goal of the season against PEC Zwolle.

On 31 January 2023, Sylla joined Ligue 2 club Caen on a two-and-a-half-year contract.

Personal life
Born in France, Sylla is of Malian descent. He is the brother of the Malian international Yacouba Sylla.

Career statistics

References

External links

 
 
 

1999 births
People from Étampes
Footballers from Essonne
French sportspeople of Malian descent
Living people
French footballers
France youth international footballers
Association football forwards
Association football wingers
AS Monaco FC players
FC Utrecht players
Jong FC Utrecht players
Stade Malherbe Caen players
Championnat National 2 players
Ligue 1 players
Eredivisie players
Eerste Divisie players
French expatriate footballers
French expatriate sportspeople in Monaco
Expatriate footballers in Monaco
French expatriate sportspeople in the Netherlands
Expatriate footballers in the Netherlands